Sehima is a genus of mostly Asian and African plants in the grass family.

The generic name is derived from the Arabic  sæḥīm ('black'), local name of the type species in its native Yemen.

 Species
 Sehima galpinii Stent - Angola, Mozambique, KwaZulu-Natal, Eswatini, Mpumalanga, Limpopo
 Sehima ischaemoides Forssk. - drier parts of Asia and Africa from Cape Verde to Limpopo to India
 Sehima nervosum (Rottler) Stapf - eastern Africa from Eritrea to Mozambique; southern Asia from Yemen to southern China to Java; New Guinea to northern Australia
 Sehima notatum (Hack.) A.Camus - Uttar Pradesh
 Sehima sulcatum (Hack.) A.Camus - Myanmar, Tamil Nadu, Madhya Pradesh

 formerly included
see Andropogon Andropterum Eremochloa Ischaemum Pogonachne Thelepogon Triplopogon

References

External links
 Grassbase, the World Online Grass Flora: Sehima

Andropogoneae
Poaceae genera
Grasses of Africa
Grasses of Asia
Grasses of Oceania
Afrotropical realm flora
Indomalayan realm flora
Taxa named by Peter Forsskål